Ferenc Plattkó (born in Budapest, Hungary, 2 December 1898, died Santiago, Chile, 2 September 1983), also known as Ferenc Platko or Francisco Platko (in Spain his mothers maiden name "Kopiletz" has been appended according to local customs) was a Hungarian footballer and manager of Austrian origin. During the 1910s and 1920s he played as a goalkeeper for Vasas SC, WAC Vienna, KAFK Kula, MTK Hungária FC, FC Barcelona, and Recreativo de Huelva. 

He subsequently worked as a coach in Europe and South America, most notably with FC Barcelona, Colo-Colo, River Plate, Boca Juniors and Chile. Platko was an early FC Barcelona legend and was a team-mate of Paulino Alcántara, Josep Samitier and Sagibarba. His bravery as a goalkeeper was immortalized by Rafael Alberti in the poem Oda A Platko. After retiring as a player he returned to the club as a coach on two occasions (1934–35, 1955–56). Plattkó played 6 matches for the Hungarian national team between 1917 and 1923.

Career

Early career
Platko began his career as a goalkeeper in his hometown of Budapest with local club Vasas SC in 1917. After a brief spell in Austria at Wiener AF in 1920, he returned to Vasas for another season. Between 1917 and 1923, Platko also played six games for Hungary. In the season 1921/22 he was the coach and goalkeeper for KAFK Kula from Kula (Serbia) where he won the Subotica subassociation championship earning promotion to the Second League of the Kingdom of Serbs, Croats and Slovenes. In 1922 MTK played two friendlies against FC Barcelona. Both games finished as 0–0 draws and FC Barcelona, impressed with Platko offered him a contract.

Barcelona 

Platko replaced the legendary Ricardo Zamora, but soon established himself as a legend in his own right. He spent seven years at FC Barcelona between 1923 and 1930. During that time he won six Campionat de Catalunya titles, three Copa del Rey and the first ever La Liga title. The poem Oda A Platko came about following the Copa del Rey final in 1928. FC Barcelona took three games to beat Real Sociedad and during the first encounter on 20 May, Rafael Alberti was so impressed with the bravery of Platko that he later wrote the poem in his honour.  Platko finished his playing career at Recreativo de Huelva and retired as a player in 1931.  He soon began his career as a coach, working in France with FC Mulhouse (1932–33) and Racing Club de Roubaix (1933–34), before returning to FC Barcelona as a coach for the 1934/35 season.  Despite guiding the club to another Campionat de Catalunya, the following season he was replaced by Patrick O'Connell.  After two decades away from the club Platko was reappointed coach of CF Barcelona for the 1955/56 season.  During this season the club, inspired by Ladislao Kubala and Luis Suárez, won 10 consecutive La Liga games in a row.  The record remained unbeaten until 2005.  Despite this run CF Barcelona only managed to finish second in La Liga behind Atlético Bilbao and Platko was replaced the following season.

South America 
During the two decades away from FC Barcelona established himself as a coach in South America. In 1939, during the first of three spells at Colo-Colo he guided the club to the Chilean Championionship.  In 1940 he had a spell in charge of River Plate in Argentina before he returned to Chile and Colo-Colo in 1941, winning a second Chilean Championship. In 1941 he took charge of Chile and continued as national team manager until 1945, coaching the team at both the South American Championship in both 1942 and 1945.  During 1942 he also coached two other Chilean clubs, Club Magallanes and Santiago Wanderers. In 1949 he coached Boca Juniors and in 1953 he returned to Colo-Colo for a third time and won a third Chilean Championionship.

For the season 1955/56 he returned to FC Barcelona with which he became runner up in the league one point behind Athletic Bilbao.  His balance of 22 wins three draws and five defeats had been the best for the club yet. The series of ten straight wins in the league was only outdone under Frank Rijkard in the 2005/06 season. His downfall was a 1–3 defeat on 20 May in the cup quarterfinals against local rivals Español. The club concluded, the relationship between the team and Plattkó was broken, and replaced him for the return match, which ended 4-4, with the club legend Josep Samitier.

The next years Plattkó spent in Brazil as talent scout and player observer. later he returned to Chile where in 1965 he took on a last coaching assignment when he took on lowly first division outfit CD San Luis de Quillota from the region of Valparaíso, with which he ended third from the bottom, which however was one up from the previous season.

Personal life

The Platko Brothers 
Franz Platko also had two brothers, Esteban Platko and Carlos Platko who followed him to Spain and subsequently established themselves as coaches. Esteban coached, among others Real Valladolid (1928–31, 1934–40), Granada CF (1943–45) and RCD Mallorca while Carlos coached Real Valladolid (1941–43), Celta de Vigo (1944–46), Girona FC (1948–49) and Sporting de Gijón.

Honours

Player 
Barcelona
 La Liga (1): 1928–29
 Copa del Rey (3): 1925, 1926, 1928
 Catalan Champions (6): 1923–24, 1924–25, 1925–26, 1926–27, 1927–28, 1929–30

Manager 
Barcelona
 Catalan Champions (1): 1934–35
Venus București
 Liga I (1): 1936–37
Colo-Colo
 Primera División (3): 1939, 1941, 1953

Ode to Platko 
Nobody forgets, Platko,
No, nobody, nobody, nobody,
blond bear of Hungary.
Nor the sea,
That in front of you jumped without being able to defend himself.
Nor rain. Nor the wind, that were the one that roared the most. 
Nor the sea, nor the wind, Platko, 
blond Platko of blood, 
goalkeeper in the dust, lightning rod.
No, nobody, nobody, nobody.
blue and white T-shirts, on the air, 
real T-shirts,
opposite, against you, flying and dragging you. 
With alligator blood in your mouth, 
Platko, distant Platko, 
blond broken Platko, 
tiger burning in the grass of another country.
You, key, Platko, you, broken key,
golden key fallen in front of the golden porch

This is only very rough translation of poem, needs improving

References

Literature 
 Tamás Dénes, Mihály Sándor, Éva B. Bába: A magyar labdarúgás története I.: Amatorök és álamatorök (1897–1926), Campus Kiadó (Debreceni Campus Nonprofit Közhasznú Kft.), Debrecen (HU), 2014.

External links

 
 
 La Liga players stats
 Franz Platko (1934-35 and 1955-56), FC Barcelona (per 2020-08-20)
 Plattkó Ferenc (Record with the Chile national team), Partidos de la Roja (per 2020-08-20)
 Plattkó Ferenc y Waldo Sanhueza (Record with the Chile national team), Partidos de la Roja (per 2020-08-20)

1898 births
1983 deaths
Footballers from Budapest
Hungarian people of Austrian descent
Hungarian footballers
Hungary international footballers
Hungarian expatriate footballers
Hungarian football managers
Hungarian expatriate football managers
Association football goalkeepers
Vasas SC players
FK Hajduk Kula players
Expatriate footballers in Yugoslavia
MTK Budapest FC players
FC Ripensia Timișoara players
La Liga players
FC Barcelona players
Recreativo de Huelva players
FC Mulhouse players
Ligue 1 players
FC Mulhouse managers
FC Barcelona managers
La Liga managers
MKS Cracovia managers
RC Celta de Vigo managers
Colo-Colo managers
Club Atlético River Plate managers
Chile national football team managers
Boca Juniors managers
Expatriate football managers in Argentina
Expatriate football managers in Chile
Expatriate football managers in France
Expatriate football managers in Spain
Expatriate football managers in Poland
Hungarian expatriate sportspeople in Poland
Hungarian expatriate sportspeople in Yugoslavia
Hungarian expatriate sportspeople in Argentina
Hungarian expatriate sportspeople in Chile
Magallanes managers